Bruno Maltar (born 6 October 1994) is a Croatian former racing cyclist. He rode at the UCI Road World Championships in 2013 and 2014.

Major results
Source: 

2011
 2nd Time trial, National Junior Road Championships
2013
 2nd Time trial, National Road Championships
2014
 1st  Time trial, National Road Championships
2015
 National Road Championships
1st  Under-23 time trial
2nd Time trial
2nd Under-23 road race
2016
 1st  Time trial, National Under-23 Road Championships
2018
 3rd Overall Tour of Albania

References

External links

1994 births
Living people
Croatian male cyclists
People from Valpovo
European Games competitors for Croatia
Cyclists at the 2015 European Games
21st-century Croatian people